Olímpica metro station is a station of the Mexico City Metro in the colonias (neighborhoods) of Jardines de Aragón and La Olímpica II, in Ecatepec de Morelos, State of Mexico, in the metropolitan area of Mexico City. It is an at-grade station with one island platform served by Line B (the Green-and-Gray Line), between Plaza Aragón and Ecatepec stations. The name of the station references the colonia of the same name and its pictogram depicts the Olympic rings. The station was opened on 30 November 2000, on the first day of service between Ciudad Azteca and Buenavista metro stations. The facilities are accessible for people with disabilities as there are tactile pavings and braille signage plates. In 2019, Olímpica metro station had an average daily ridership of 16,745 passengers, making it the eleventh most used on the line.

Location
Olímpica is a metro station along Carlos Hank González Avenue (also known as Central Avenue), in Ecatepec de Morelos, State of Mexico, a neighboring municipality of Mexico City. The station serves the colonias (Mexican Spanish for "neighborhoods") of Jardines de Aragón and La Olímpica II. Within the system, it lies between Plaza Aragón and Ecatepec metro stations.

Exits
There are two exits:
North: Carlos Hank González Avenue and Valle de Santiago Street, Jardines de Aragón.
South: Carlos Hank González Avenue and Grecia Street, La Olímpica II.

History and construction
Line B of the Mexico City Metro was built by Empresas ICA; Olímpica metro station opened on 30 November 2000, on the first day of the Ciudad Azteca–Buenavista service. The station is partially accessible for people with disabilities as there are tactile pavings and braille signage plates. The pedestrian bridges that connect the access to the station are adapted for bicycles as a bicycle lane was built in 2015 on the adjacent median strip. The station's pictogram features the silhouette of the five interlocked Olympic rings as a reference to the colonia of the same name; the etymology of the word  is related to the southern town of Olympia, Greece, and the Mount Olympus, in Northern Greece.

From 23 April to 28 June 2020, the station was temporarily closed due to the COVID-19 pandemic in Mexico. The closure was protested by taxi drivers serving the station's area.

Ridership
According to the data provided by the authorities since the 2000s, commuters have averaged per year between 19,300 and 21,600 daily entrances in the last decade. In 2019, before the impact of the COVID-19 pandemic on public transport, the station had a ridership of 6,112,152 passengers, which was an increase of 244,639 passengers compared to 2018. In the same year, Olímpica metro station was the 109th busiest station of the system's 195 stations, and it was the line's eleventh-most used.

Notes

References

External links
 

2000 establishments in Mexico
Accessible Mexico City Metro stations
Ecatepec de Morelos
Mexico City Metro Line B stations
Mexico City Metro stations outside Mexico City
Railway stations opened in 2000